Joseph Stern (born September 3, 1940) is an American television, film and theater producer and actor.

Life and career
Stern, who was born in Los Angeles, graduated from Fairfax High School and UCLA. Aiming to become a professional Shakespearean actor, Stern auditioned at Joe Papp's Public Theatre and was hired there in his first paid acting job.

As an actor, Stern played the role of Larry Hale on the CBS soap opera Love Is a Many-Splendored Thing from 1969 to 1971. During the 1970s, he made some guest appearances on TV series' including The Rockford Files, M*A*S*H, Kojak, Family,  The Feather and Father Gang and Hart to Hart.

Stern is best known for producing such films and television series as Law & Order, Cagney & Lacey, Judging Amy, Dad and No Man's Land. In all, he has produced over 250 episodes of television, as well as numerous long form specials and films. He has had several overall deals and has worked for four studios and six networks. His development
for them amounted to over twenty pilot scripts, eleven of which were shot and six that have made it to series.

Stern is also the founder of The Matrix Theatre Company.

Filmography

References

External links

Living people
1940 births
American film producers
American television producers
20th-century American Jews
American male film actors
American male television actors
American male stage actors
21st-century American Jews